Scopus is Elsevier's abstract and citation database launched in 2004. Scopus covers nearly 36,377 titles (22,794 active titles and 13,583 inactive titles) from approximately 11,678 publishers, of which 34,346 are peer-reviewed journals in top-level subject fields: life sciences, social sciences, physical sciences and health sciences. It covers three types of sources: book series, journals, and trade journals. All journals covered in the Scopus database are reviewed for sufficiently high quality each year according to four types of numerical quality measure for each title; those are h-Index, CiteScore, SJR (SCImago Journal Rank) and SNIP (source normalized impact per paper). Searches in Scopus also incorporate searches of patent database Lexis-Nexis, albeit with a limited functionality.

Overview
Comparing ease of use and coverage of Scopus and the Web of Science (WOS), a 2006 study concluded that "Scopus is easy to navigate, even for the novice user. ... The ability to search both forward and backward from a particular citation would be very helpful to the researcher. The multidisciplinary aspect allows the researcher to easily search outside of his discipline" and "One advantage of WOS over Scopus is the depth of coverage, with the full WOS database going back to 1945 and Scopus going back to 1966. However, Scopus and WOS complement each other as neither resource is all-inclusive."

Scopus also offers author profiles which cover affiliations, number of publications and their bibliographic data, references, and details on the number of citations each published document has received. It has alerting features that allow registered users to track changes to a profile and a facility to calculate authors' h-index. In 2016, a gratis website, Scopus CiteScore, was introduced. It provides citation data for all 25,000+ active titles such as journals, conference proceedings and books in Scopus and provides an alternative to the impact factor, a journal-level indicator which may correlate negatively with reliability.

Scopus IDs for individual authors can be integrated with the non-proprietary digital identifier ORCID.

In 2018, Scopus started embedding partial information about the open access status of works, using Unpaywall data.

Content selection and advisory board 
Since Elsevier is the owner of Scopus and is also one of the main international publishers of scientific journals, an independent and international Scopus Content Selection and Advisory Board (CSAB) was established in 2009 to prevent a potential conflict of interest in the choice of journals to be included in the database and to maintain an open and transparent content coverage policy, regardless of publisher. The board consists of scientists and subject librarians. Nevertheless, critique over a perceived conflict of interest has continued.

CSAB team is responsible for inclusion and exclusion of different titles on Scopus. Since 2004, they have included 41525 and excluded 688 titles The re-evaluation policy is claimed to be based on four criteria of Publication Concern, Under Performance, Outlier Performance and Continuous curation. Since 2016, the CSAB has re-evaluated 990 titles published by 539 different publishers leading to 536 titles discontinued for indexing. Nevertheless, research continues to show the inclusion of predatory journals.

Derived citation metrics

CiteScore

SCImago Journal Rank

See also 
 Journalology
 List of academic databases and search engines

References

External links 

 

2004 establishments
2004 introductions
Bibliographic databases and indexes
Elsevier
Citation indices
Library cataloging and classification